Majed Saeed Sultan (born Elijah Kosgei on November 3, 1986, in Kenya) is a middle-distance runner now representing Qatar after switching from Kenya. He specializes at the 800 metres, a distance where he became 2004 world junior champion and competed in the Olympic Games in Athens.

In September 2005 he became Asian champion.

External links

1986 births
Living people
Qatari male middle-distance runners
Kenyan male middle-distance runners
Olympic male middle-distance runners
Athletes (track and field) at the 2004 Summer Olympics
Olympic athletes of Qatar
Kenyan emigrants to Qatar
Naturalised citizens of Qatar
Qatari people of Kenyan descent